The Billy Frank Jr. Nisqually National Wildlife Refuge is a wildlife preserve operated by the United States Fish and Wildlife Service on the Nisqually River Delta near Puget Sound in northeastern Thurston County, Washington and northwestern Pierce County, Washington. The refuge is located just off Interstate 5, between the cities of Tacoma and Olympia.

History 

The 12.6 km2 refuge was created in 1974 to provide habitat and nesting areas for waterfowl and other migratory birds. It includes a protected estuary, salt marshes and open mudflats, freshwater marshes, open grassland, and riparian woodland and brush. An additional  is protected by the disjoint Black River Unit on a tributary of the Chehalis River. Local environmentalist Margaret McKenny is attributed for the preservation of this area.

On December 18, 2015, President Barack Obama signed the Billy Frank Jr. Tell Your Story Act into law, redesignating the wildlife refuge in honor of Nisqually tribe leader and treaty rights activist Billy Frank, Jr., who died in 2014. It also established the Medicine Creek Treaty National Memorial within the refuge to commemorate the Treaty of Medicine Creek. The national memorial is where the treaty was signed at the Treaty Tree, which is only accessible by boat up McAllister Creek.

Wildlife
The wildlife refuge is home to the Nisqually River Delta, which has the unique status as Washington's largest relatively undisturbed estuary.  The confluence of the freshwater Nisqually River and the saltwater south Puget Sound has created a variety of unique environments, each rich in nutrients and natural resources for the local wildlife.  The delta provides habitats for more than 300 different species of fish and wildlife.

In 1904 the Brown Farm Dike, five miles long, was created to protect farmland from tidal surge, resulting in a loss of important habitat for young fish, birds and marine mammals such as harbor seals. As part of a long running project to restore the estuary, in 2009 a new 10,000 foot dike was installed behind the old dike and four miles of the old Brown Farm Dike were removed. This enabled the tidal flows to reclaim 762 acres to the estuary.

Sea life features 24 species of fish located in one of three habitats: riverine, estuarine or the Nisqually Reach nearshore.  Large populations of fall Chinook salmon, starry flounder and shiner perch offer a sampling of the fish that are abundantly available. 
The saltmarshes and mudflats are located outside of the dikes.  Rich in nutrients, they are the home to clams, crabs, shrimp and worms, which in turn feed ducks, gulls and herons.

Over 20,000 birds, made up of 275 different migrating species, use the freshwater marshes and grasslands for breeding, resting or wintering.  The most abundant bird types include raptors, shorebirds and songbirds. Larger animals such as hawks and coyotes feast in the grassland due to the presence of mice and voles.

The riparian woodland and brush habitats contain many amphibians, mammals and reptiles.

See also 
 List of National Wildlife Refuges
 List of national memorials of the United States

References

External links 

Billy Frank Jr. Nisqually National Wildlife Refuge U.S. Fish and Wildlife Service

National Wildlife Refuges in Washington (state)
Protected areas of Pierce County, Washington
Protected areas of Thurston County, Washington
Lacey, Washington
Nature centers in Washington (state)
Wetlands of Washington (state)
Landforms of Pierce County, Washington
Landforms of Thurston County, Washington
National Memorials of the United States